Jacob Chemnitz (born 19 November 1984) is a Danish badminton player from the Lillerød team. In the junior event, Chemnitz had won the mixed doubles title at the 2002/2003 Danish U-19 National Championships partnered with Line Reimers who also trained at the Lillerød. He also won the mixed doubles bronze medal at the 2003 European Junior Championships with Mille Pjedsted. In the senior event, Chemnitz had won international tournaments at the 2006 Cyprus, 2007 Portugal, and Polish International tournaments partnered with Mikkel Delbo Larsen in the men's doubles. Teamed-up with Marie Røpke in the mixed doubles, they had won the 2008 Irish International.

Achievements

European Junior Championships
Mixed doubles

BWF International Challenge/Series
Men's doubles

Mixed doubles

 BWF International Challenge tournament
 BWF International Series tournament

References

External links
 

1984 births
Living people
Danish male badminton players